Fitzpaine may refer to:

Cheddon Fitzpaine, a village and civil parish in Somerset, England
Cheriton Fitzpaine, a village in Devon, England
Okeford Fitzpaine, a village and civil parish in the English county of Dorset in South West England
Staple Fitzpaine, a village and civil parish in Somerset, England
Wootton Fitzpaine, a village and civil parish in the county of Dorset in South West England